The K+ Transporter (Trk) Family is a member of the voltage-gated ion channel (VIC) superfamily. The proteins of the Trk family are derived from Gram-negative and Gram-positive bacteria, yeast and plants.

Homology 
The phylogenetic tree reveals that the proteins cluster according to phylogeny of the source organism with 
 the Gram-negative bacterial Trk proteins, 
 the Gram-negative and Gram-positive bacterial Ktr proteins, 
 the yeast proteins and 
 the plant proteins comprising four distinct clusters. 
S. cerevisiae possesses at least two paralogues, high- and low-affinity K+ transporters. Folding pattern seen in Trk proteins resembles quadruplicated primitive K+ channels of the VIC superfamily (TC #1.A.1) instead of typical 12 TMS carriers. Homology has been established between Trk carriers and VIC family channels.

Structure 
The sizes of the Trk family members vary from 423 residues to 1235 residues. The bacterial proteins are of 423-558 residues, the Triticum aestivum protein is 533 residues, and the yeast proteins vary between 841 and 1241 residues. These proteins possess 8 putative transmembrane α-helical spanners (TMSs). An 8 TMS topology with N- and C-termini on the inside, has been established for AtHKT1 of A. thaliana. and Trk2 of S. cerevisiae. This folding pattern resembles quadruplicated primitive K+ channels of the VIC superfamily (TC #1.A.1) instead of typical 12 TMS carriers. As homology has been established between Trk carriers and VIC family channels.

Function 
Trk family members regulate various K+ transporters in all three domains of life. These regulatory subunits are generally called K+ transport/nucleotide binding subunits. TrkA domains can bind NAD+ and NADH, possibly allowing K+ transporters to be responsive to the redox state of the cell. The ratio of NADH/NAD+ may control gating. Multiple crystal structures of two KTN domains complexed with NAD+ or NADH reveal that these ligands control the oligomeric (tetrameric) state of KTN. The results suggest that KTN is inherently flexible, undergoing a large conformational change through a hinge motion. The KTN domains of Kef channels interact dynamically with the transporter. The KTN conformation then controls permease activity.

Both yeast transport systems are believed to function by K+:H+ symport, but the wheat protein functions by K+:Na+ symport. It is possible that some of these proteins can function by a channel-type mechanism. Positively charged residues in TMS8 of several ktr/Trk/HKT transporters probably face the channel and block a conformational change that is essential for channel activity while allowing secondary active transport.

The putative generalized transport reaction catalyzed by the Trk family members is:K+ (out) + H+ (out) ⇌ K+ (in) + H+ (in).

References 

Protein families
Membrane proteins
Transmembrane proteins
Transmembrane transporters
Transport proteins
Integral membrane proteins